London, the capital city of England, is one of the world's most visited cities in terms of international visits. It is home to an array of notable tourist attractions, attracting 20.42 million international visitors in 2018, an additional 27.8 million overnighting domestic tourists in 2017, and 280 million day-trippers in 2015.

Effect on the economy 
The travel and tourism sector in the United Kingdom contributed GBP66.3 billion to the gross domestic product (GDP), 3.4% of total GDP in 2016 and is expected to rise by 2.2% pa, from 2017 to 2027, to GBP84.6 billion, which could comprise up to 3.6% of the total GDP in 2027.

In 2011, visitors to London spent £9.4 billion, which is a little more than half of the total amount international visitors spent in the whole of the United Kingdom the same year.

A 2013 study by Deloitte and Oxford Economics concluded that the tourism sector employed 700,000 people, accounting for 11.6 percent of London's GDP.

Notable attractions 
The London Eye is a giant Ferris wheel located on the edge of the River Thames. It is 135 metres tall and has a diameter of 120 metres. A short walk away, the area is home to the London Aquarium, Elizabeth Tower, the Houses of Parliament, Westminster Abbey and Nelson's Column. In 2013, the tallest building in London, The Shard, opened a viewing platform to the public. Other major tourist attractions in London include the Tower of London, Buckingham Palace (although this is only open to the public during a limited number of months in the summer), Tower Bridge Experience, Madame Tussauds, ZSL London Zoo, London Dungeon and St Paul's Cathedral.

The Association of Leading Visitor Attractions reported that the following were the top 10 visitor attractions in 2017:
 British Museum – 5.9 million visits
 Tate Modern – 5.7 million
 National Gallery – 5.2 million
 Natural History Museum, London – 4.4 million
 Victoria and Albert Museum – 3.7 million
 Science Museum, London – 3.3 million
 Southbank Centre – 3.2 million
 Somerset House – 3.2 million
 Tower of London – 2.8 million
 Royal Museums Greenwich – 2.6 million

Museums and galleries 

There are many museums and art galleries in the London area, the majority of which are free to enter.  Many of them are popular places for tourism. In addition to Tate Modern and the National Gallery, notable galleries include Tate Britain and the National Portrait Gallery.

Parks and open spaces 
London has several parks for tourists to stroll, rest and relax in.  They include Hyde Park, Regent's Park, Green Park, St. James's Park, Hampstead Heath and Greenwich Park.

Economics 

London attracted 16.8 million foreign visitors in 2013, they accounted for 51.4% of all visitors. Below is the visitors information:
 France 1,904,000
 United States 1,878,000
 Germany 1,295,000
 Italy 1,072,000
 Spain 866,000
 The Netherlands 687,000
 Australia 687,000
 Republic of Ireland 611,000
 Belgium 531,000
 Sweden 516,000

Public transportation 
Public transportation is essential in bringing tourists to and from attractions, and deciding the means of and cost of their travel. London's transportation can also be an attraction in itself. London offers many forms of public transportation: the Underground (commonly referred to as the Tube), double-decker red buses, and taxis. Tourists can purchase Travelcards to take the Tube, bus, or overground trains through designated zones.

References

External links 
 
 Tourism in London